In law, common law (also known as judicial precedent, judge-made law, or case law) is the body of law created by judges and similar quasi-judicial tribunals by virtue of being stated in written opinions.

The defining characteristic of common law is that it arises as precedent. Common law courts look to the past decisions of courts to synthesize the legal principles of past cases. Stare decisis, the principle that cases should be decided according to consistent principled rules so that similar facts will yield similar results, lies at the heart of all common law systems. If a court finds that a similar dispute as the present one has been resolved in the past, the court is generally bound to follow the reasoning used in the prior decision. If, however, the court finds that the current dispute is fundamentally distinct from all previous cases (a "matter of first impression"), and legislative statutes are either silent or ambiguous on the question, judges have the authority and duty to resolve the issue. The opinion that a common law judge gives agglomerates with past decisions as precedent to bind future judges and litigants.

The common law, so named because it was "common" to all the king's courts across England, originated in the practices of the courts of the English kings in the centuries following the Norman Conquest in 1066. The British Empire later spread the English legal system to its colonies, many of which retain the common law system today. These common law systems are legal systems that give great weight to judicial precedent, and to the style of reasoning inherited from the English legal system.

The term "common law", referring to the body of law made by the judiciary, is often distinguished from statutory law and regulations, which are laws adopted by the legislature and executive respectively. In legal systems that recognise the common law, judicial precedent stands in contrast to and on equal footing with statutes. The other major legal system used by countries is the civil law, which codifies its legal principles into legal codes and does not recognise judicial opinions as binding.

Today, one-third of the world's population lives in common law jurisdictions or in mixed legal systems that combine the common law with the civil law, including Antigua and Barbuda, Australia,  Bahamas, Bangladesh, Barbados, Belize, Botswana, Burma, Cameroon, Canada (both the federal system and all its provinces except Quebec), Cyprus, Dominica, Fiji, Ghana, Grenada, Guyana, Hong Kong, India, Ireland, Israel, Jamaica, Kenya, Liberia, Malaysia, Malta, Marshall Islands, Micronesia, Namibia, Nauru, New Zealand, Nigeria, Pakistan, Palau, Papua New Guinea, Philippines, Sierra Leone, Singapore, South Africa, Sri Lanka, Trinidad and Tobago, the United Kingdom (including its overseas territories such as Gibraltar), the United States (both the federal system and 49 of its 50 states), and Zimbabwe.

Definitions 
The term common law has many connotations. The first three set out here are the most-common usages within the legal community. Other connotations from past centuries are sometimes seen and are sometimes heard in everyday speech.

Common law as opposed to statutory law and regulatory law  
The first definition of "common law" given in Black's Law Dictionary, 10th edition, 2014, is "The body of law derived from judicial decisions, rather than from statutes or constitutions; [synonym] CASELAW, [contrast] STATUTORY LAW". This usage is given as the first definition in modern legal dictionaries, is characterized as the "most common" usage among legal professionals, and is the usage frequently seen in decisions of courts. In this connotation, "common law" distinguishes the authority that promulgated a law. For example, the law in most Anglo-American jurisdictions includes "statutory law" enacted by a legislature, "regulatory law" (in the U.S.) or "delegated legislation" (in the U.K.) promulgated by executive branch agencies pursuant to delegation of rule-making authority from the legislature, and common law or "case law", i.e., decisions issued by courts (or quasi-judicial tribunals within agencies). This first connotation can be further differentiated into:

Publication of decisions, and indexing, is essential to the development of common law, and thus governments and private publishers publish law reports. While all decisions in common law jurisdictions are precedent (at varying levels and scope as discussed throughout the article on precedent), some become "leading cases" or "landmark decisions" that are cited especially often.

Common law legal systems as opposed to civil law legal systems  
Black's Law Dictionary, 10th ed., definition 2, differentiates "common law" jurisdictions and legal systems from "civil law" or "code" jurisdictions. Common law systems place great weight on court decisions, which are considered "law" with the same force of law as statutes—for nearly a millennium, common law courts have had the authority to make law where no legislative statute exists, and statutes mean what courts interpret them to mean.

By contrast, in civil law jurisdictions (the legal tradition that prevails, or is combined with common law, in Europe and most non-Islamic, non-common law countries), courts lack authority to act if there is no statute. Civil law judges tend to give less weight to judicial precedent, which means that a civil law judge deciding a given case has more freedom to interpret the text of a statute independently (compared to a common law judge in the same circumstances), and therefore less predictably. For example, the Napoleonic code expressly forbade French judges to pronounce general principles of law. The role of providing overarching principles, which in common law jurisdictions is provided in judicial opinions, in civil law jurisdictions is filled by giving greater weight to scholarly literature, as explained below.

Law as opposed to equity  
Black's Law Dictionary, 10th ed., definition 4, differentiates "common law" (or just "law") from "equity". Before 1873, England had two complementary court systems: courts of "law" which could only award money damages and recognized only the legal owner of property, and courts of "equity" (courts of chancery) that could issue injunctive relief (that is, a court order to a party to do something, give something to someone, or stop doing something) and recognized trusts of property. This split propagated to many of the colonies, including the United States.  The states of Delaware, Mississippi, South Carolina, and Tennessee continue to have divided Courts of Law and Courts of Chancery. In New Jersey, the appellate courts are unified, but the trial courts are organized into a Chancery Division and a Law Division.

For most purposes, most jurisdictions, including the U.S. federal system and most states, have merged the two courts. Additionally, even before the separate courts were merged, most courts were permitted to apply both law and equity, though under potentially different procedural law. Nonetheless, the historical distinction between "law" and "equity" remains important today when the case involves issues such as the following:
 categorizing and prioritizing rights to property—for example, the same article of property often has a "legal title" and an "equitable title", and these two groups of ownership rights may be held by different people.
 in the United States, determining whether the Seventh Amendment's right to a jury trial applies (a determination of a fact necessary to resolution of a "common law" claim) vs. whether the issue will be decided by a judge (issues of what the law is, and all issues relating to equity).
 the standard of review and degree of deference given by an appellate tribunal to the decision of the lower tribunal under review (issues of law are reviewed de novo, that is, "as if new" from scratch by the appellate tribunal, while most issues of equity are reviewed for "abuse of discretion", that is, with great deference to the tribunal below).
 the remedies available and rules of procedure to be applied.

Courts of equity rely on common law (in the sense of this first connotation) principles of binding precedent.

Archaic meanings and historical uses  

In addition, there are several historical (but now archaic) uses of the term that, while no longer current, provide background context that assists in understanding the meaning of "common law" today.

In one usage that is now archaic, but that gives insight into the history of the common law, "common law" referred to the pre-Christian system of law, imported by the Saxons to England, and dating to before the Norman conquest, and before there was any consistent law to be applied.

While historically the  became a secure point of reference in continental European legal systems, in England it was not a point of reference at all.

The English Court of Common Pleas dealt with lawsuits in which the Monarch had no interest, i.e., between commoners.

Black's Law Dictionary, 10th ed., definition 3 is "General law common to a country as a whole, as opposed to special law that has only local application." From at least the 11th century and continuing for several centuries after that, there were several different circuits in the royal court system, served by itinerant judges who would travel from town to town dispensing the King's justice in "assizes". The term "common law" was used to describe the law held in common between the circuits and the different stops in each circuit. The more widely a particular law was recognized, the more weight it held, whereas purely local customs were generally subordinate to law recognized in a plurality of jurisdictions.

Misconceptions and imprecise nonlawyer usages 

As used by non-lawyers in popular culture, the term "common law" connotes law based on ancient and unwritten universal custom of the people. The "ancient unwritten universal custom" view was the foundation of the first treatises by Blackstone and Coke, and was universal among lawyers and judges from the earliest times to the mid-19th century.  However, for 100 years, lawyers and judges have recognized that the "ancient unwritten universal custom" view does not accord with the facts of the origin and growth of the law, and it is not held within the legal profession today.
	 
Under the modern view, "common law" is not grounded in "custom" or "ancient usage", but rather acquires force of law instantly (without the delay implied by the term "custom" or "ancient") when pronounced by a higher court, because and to the extent the proposition is stated in judicial opinion. From the earliest times through the late 19th century, the dominant theory was that the common law was a pre-existent law or system of rules, a social standard of justice that existed in the habits, customs, and thoughts of the people. Under this older view, the legal profession considered it no part of a judge's duty to make new or change existing law, but only to expound and apply the old. By the early 20th century, largely at the urging of Oliver Wendell Holmes (as discussed throughout this article), this view had fallen into the minority view: Holmes pointed out that the older view worked undesirable and unjust results, and hampered a proper development of the law. In the century since Holmes, the dominant understanding has been that common law "decisions are themselves law, or rather the rules which the courts lay down in making the decisions constitute law". Holmes wrote in a 1917 opinion, "The common law is not a brooding omnipresence in the sky, but the articulate voice of some sovereign or quasi-sovereign that can be identified."  Among legal professionals (lawyers and judges), the change in understanding occurred in the late 19th and early 20th centuries (as explained later in this article), though lay (non-legal) dictionaries were decades behind in recognizing the change.

The reality of the modern view, and implausibility of the old "ancient unwritten universal custom" view, can be seen in practical operation: under the pre-1870 view, (a) the "common law" should have been absolutely static over centuries (but it evolved), (b) jurisdictions could not logically diverge from each other (but nonetheless did and do today), (c) a new decision logically needed to operate retroactively (but did not), and (d) there was no standard to decide which English medieval customs should be "law" and which should not. All five tensions resolve under the modern view: (a) the common law evolved to meet the needs of the times (e.g., trial by combat passed out of the law by the 15th century), (b) the common law in different jurisdictions may diverge, (c) new decisions may (but need not) have retroactive operation, and (d) court decisions are effective immediately as they are issued, not years later, or after they become "custom", and questions of what "custom" might have been at some "ancient" time are simply irrelevant.

 Common law, as the term is used among lawyers in the present day, is not grounded in "custom" or "ancient usage". Common law acquires force of law because it is pronounced by a court (or similar tribunal) in an opinion.
 Common law is not frozen in time, and no longer beholden to 11th-, 13th-, or 17th-century English law. Rather, the common law evolves daily and immediately as courts issue precedential decisions (as explained later in this article), and all parties in the legal system (courts, lawyers, and all others) are responsible for up-to-date knowledge. There is no fixed reference point (for example the 11th or 18th centuries) for the definition of "common law", except in a handful of isolated contexts. Much of what was "customary" in the 13th or 17th or 18th century has no part of the common law today; much of the common law today has no antecedent in those earlier centuries.
 The common law is not "unwritten". Common law exists in writing—as must any law that is to be applied consistently—in the written decisions of judges.
 Common law is not the product of "universal consent". Rather, the common law is often anti-majoritarian.

People using pseudolegal tactics and arguments have frequently claimed to base themselves on common law; notably, the radical anti-government sovereign citizens and freemen on the land movements, who deny the legitimacy of their countries' legal systems, base their beliefs on idiosyncratic interpretations of common law. "Common law" has also been used as an alibi by groups such as the far-right American Patriot movement for setting up kangaroo courts in order to conduct vigilante actions or intimidate their opponents.

Basic principles of common law

Common law adjudication 

In a common law jurisdiction several stages of research and analysis are required to determine "what the law is" in a given situation. First, one must ascertain the facts. Then, one must locate any relevant statutes and cases. Then one must extract the principles, analogies and statements by various courts of what they consider important to determine how the next court is likely to rule on the facts of the present case. Later decisions, and decisions of higher courts or legislatures carry more weight than earlier cases and those of lower courts. Finally, one integrates all the lines drawn and reasons given, and determines "what the law is". Then, one applies that law to the facts.

In practice, common law systems are considerably more complicated than the simplified system described above. The decisions of a court are binding only in a particular jurisdiction, and even within a given jurisdiction, some courts have more power than others. For example, in most jurisdictions, decisions by appellate courts are binding on lower courts in the same jurisdiction, and on future decisions of the same appellate court, but decisions of lower courts are only non-binding persuasive authority. Interactions between common law, constitutional law, statutory law and regulatory law also give rise to considerable complexity.

Common law evolves to meet changing social needs and improved understanding  
Oliver Wendell Holmes Jr. cautioned that "the proper derivation of general principles in both common and constitutional law ... arise gradually, in the emergence of a consensus from a multitude of particularized prior decisions". Justice Cardozo noted the "common law does not work from pre-established truths of universal and inflexible validity to conclusions derived from them deductively", but "[i]ts method is inductive, and it draws its generalizations from particulars".

The common law is more malleable than statutory law. First, common law courts are not absolutely bound by precedent, but can (when extraordinarily good reason is shown) reinterpret and revise the law, without legislative intervention, to adapt to new trends in political, legal and social philosophy. Second, the common law evolves through a series of gradual steps, that gradually works out all the details, so that over a decade or more, the law can change substantially but without a sharp break, thereby reducing disruptive effects. In contrast to common law incrementalism, the legislative process is very difficult to get started, as legislatures tend to delay action until a situation is  intolerable. For these reasons, legislative changes tend to be large, jarring and disruptive (sometimes positively, sometimes negatively, and sometimes with unintended consequences).

One example of the gradual change that typifies evolution of the common law is the gradual change in liability for negligence. The traditional common law rule through most of the 19th century was that a plaintiff could not recover for a defendant's negligent production or distribution of a harmful instrumentality unless the two were in privity of contract. Thus, only the immediate purchaser could recover for a product defect, and if a part was built up out of parts from parts manufacturers, the ultimate buyer could not recover for injury caused by a defect in the part. In an 1842 English case, Winterbottom v. Wright, the postal service had contracted with Wright to maintain its coaches. Winterbottom was a driver for the post. When the coach failed and injured Winterbottom, he sued Wright. The Winterbottom court recognized that there would be "absurd and outrageous consequences" if an injured person could sue any person peripherally involved, and knew it had to draw a line somewhere, a limit on the causal connection between the negligent conduct and the injury. The court looked to the contractual relationships, and held that liability would only flow as far as the person in immediate contract ("privity") with the negligent party.

A first exception to this rule arose in 1852, in the case of Thomas v. Winchester, when New York's highest court held that mislabeling a poison as an innocuous herb, and then selling the mislabeled poison through a dealer who would be expected to resell it, put "human life in imminent danger". Thomas relied on this reason to create an exception to the "privity" rule. In 1909, New York held in Statler v. Ray Mfg. Co. that a coffee urn manufacturer was liable to a person injured when the urn exploded, because the urn "was of such a character inherently that, when applied to the purposes for which it was designed, it was liable to become a source of great danger to many people if not carefully and properly constructed".

Yet the privity rule survived. In Cadillac Motor Car Co. v. Johnson (decided in 1915 by the federal appeals court for New York and several neighboring states), the court held that a car owner could not recover for injuries from a defective wheel, when the automobile owner had a contract only with the automobile dealer and not with the manufacturer, even though there was "no question that the wheel was made of dead and 'dozy' wood, quite insufficient for its purposes". The Cadillac court was willing to acknowledge that the case law supported exceptions for "an article dangerous in its nature or likely to become so in the course of the ordinary usage to be contemplated by the vendor". However, held the Cadillac court, "one who manufactures articles dangerous only if defectively made, or installed, e.g., tables, chairs, pictures or mirrors hung on the walls, carriages, automobiles, and so on, is not liable to third parties for injuries caused by them, except in case of willful injury or fraud".

Finally, in the famous case of MacPherson v. Buick Motor Co., in 1916, Judge Benjamin Cardozo for New York's highest court pulled a broader principle out of these predecessor cases. The facts were almost identical to Cadillac a year earlier: a wheel from a wheel manufacturer was sold to Buick, to a dealer, to MacPherson, and the wheel failed, injuring MacPherson. Judge Cardozo held:

Cardozo's new "rule" exists in no prior case, but is inferrable as a synthesis of the "thing of danger" principle stated in them, merely extending it to "foreseeable danger" even if "the purposes for which it was designed" were not themselves "a source of great danger". MacPherson takes some care to present itself as foreseeable progression, not a wild departure. Cardozo continues to adhere to the original principle of Winterbottom, that "absurd and outrageous consequences" must be avoided, and he does so by drawing a new line in the last sentence quoted above: "There must be knowledge of a danger, not merely possible, but probable." But while adhering to the underlying principle that some boundary is necessary, MacPherson overruled the prior common law by rendering the formerly dominant factor in the boundary, that is, the privity formality arising out of a contractual relationship between persons, totally irrelevant. Rather, the most important factor in the boundary would be the nature of the thing sold and the foreseeable uses that downstream purchasers would make of the thing.

The example of the evolution of the law of negligence in the preceding paragraphs illustrates two crucial principles: (a) The common law evolves, this evolution is in the hands of judges, and judges have "made law" for hundreds of years. (b) The reasons given for a decision are often more important in the long run than the outcome in a particular case. This is the reason that judicial opinions are usually quite long, and give rationales and policies that can be balanced with judgment in future cases, rather than the bright-line rules usually embodied in statutes.

Publication of decisions 

All law systems rely on written publication of the law, so that it is accessible to all. Common law decisions are published in law reports for use by lawyers, courts and the general public.

After the American Revolution, Massachusetts became the first state to establish an official Reporter of Decisions. As newer states needed law, they often looked first to the Massachusetts Reports for authoritative precedents as a basis for their own common law. The United States federal courts relied on private publishers until after the Civil War, and only began publishing as a government function in 1874. West Publishing in Minnesota is the largest private-sector publisher of law reports in the United States. Government publishers typically issue only decisions "in the raw", while private sector publishers often add indexing, including references to the key principles of the common law involved, editorial analysis, and similar finding aids.

Interaction of constitution, statute, and executive branch regulation with common law 

In common law legal systems, the common law is crucial to understanding almost all important areas of law. For example, in England and Wales, in English Canada, and in most states of the United States, the basic law of contracts, torts and property do not exist in statute, but only in common law (though there may be isolated modifications enacted by statute). As another example, the Supreme Court of the United States in 1877, held that a Michigan statute that established rules for solemnization of marriages did not abolish pre-existing common-law marriage, because the statute did not affirmatively require statutory solemnization and was silent as to preexisting common law.

In almost all areas of the law (even those where there is a statutory framework, such as contracts for the sale of goods, or the criminal law), legislature-enacted statutes or agency-promulgated regulations generally give only terse statements of general principle, and the fine boundaries and definitions exist only in the interstitial common law. To find out what the precise law is that applies to a particular set of facts, one has to locate precedential decisions on the topic, and reason from those decisions by analogy.

In common law jurisdictions (in the sense opposed to "civil law"), legislatures operate under the assumption that statutes will be interpreted against the backdrop of the pre-existing common law. As the United States Supreme Court explained in United States v Texas, 507 U.S. 529 (1993):

{{|Just as longstanding is the principle that "[s]tatutes which invade the common law ... are to be read with a presumption favoring the retention of long-established and familiar principles, except when a statutory purpose to the contrary is evident. Isbrandtsen Co. v. Johnson, 343 U.S. 779, 783 (1952); Astoria Federal Savings & Loan Assn. v. Solimino, 501 U.S. 104, 108 (1991). In such cases, Congress does not write upon a clean slate. Astoria, 501 U.S. at 108. In order to abrogate a common-law principle, the statute must "speak directly" to the question addressed by the common law. Mobil Oil Corp. v. Higginbotham, 436 U. S. 618, 625 (1978); Milwaukee v. Illinois, 451 U. S. 304, 315 (1981).}}

For example, in most U.S. states, the criminal statutes are primarily codification of pre-existing common law. (Codification is the process of enacting a statute that collects and restates pre-existing law in a single document—when that pre-existing law is common law, the common law remains relevant to the interpretation of these statutes.) In reliance on this assumption, modern statutes often leave a number of terms and fine distinctions unstated—for example, a statute might be very brief, leaving the precise definition of terms unstated, under the assumption that these fine distinctions would be resolved in the future by the courts based upon what they then understand to be the pre-existing common law. (For this reason, many modern American law schools teach the common law of crime as it stood in England in 1789, because that centuries-old English common law is a necessary foundation to interpreting modern criminal statutes.)

With the transition from English law, which had common law crimes, to the new legal system under the U.S. Constitution, which prohibited ex post facto laws at both the federal and state level, the question was raised whether there could be common law crimes in the United States. It was settled in the case of United States v. Hudson, which decided that federal courts had no jurisdiction to define new common law crimes, and that there must always be a (constitutionally valid) statute defining the offense and the penalty for it.

Still, many states retain selected common law crimes. For example, in Virginia, the definition of the conduct that constitutes the crime of robbery exists only in the common law, and the robbery statute only sets the punishment. Virginia Code section 1-200 establishes the continued existence and vitality of common law principles and provides that "The common law of England, insofar as it is not repugnant to the principles of the Bill of Rights and Constitution of this Commonwealth, shall continue in full force within the same, and be the rule of decision, except as altered by the General Assembly."

By contrast to statutory codification of common law, some statutes displace common law, for example to create a new cause of action that did not exist in the common law, or to legislatively overrule the common law. An example is the tort of wrongful death, which allows certain persons, usually a spouse, child or estate, to sue for damages on behalf of the deceased. There is no such tort in English common law; thus, any jurisdiction that lacks a wrongful death statute will not allow a lawsuit for the wrongful death of a loved one. Where a wrongful death statute exists, the compensation or other remedy available is limited to the remedy specified in the statute (typically, an upper limit on the amount of damages). Courts generally interpret statutes that create new causes of action narrowly—that is, limited to their precise terms—because the courts generally recognize the legislature as being supreme in deciding the reach of judge-made law unless such statute should violate some "second order" constitutional law provision (cf. judicial activism). This principle is applied more strongly in fields of commercial law (contracts and the like) where predictability is of relatively higher value, and less in torts, where courts recognize a greater responsibility to "do justice".

Where a tort is rooted in common law, all traditionally recognized damages for that tort may be sued for, whether or not there is mention of those damages in the current statutory law. For instance, a person who sustains bodily injury through the negligence of another may sue for medical costs, pain, suffering, loss of earnings or earning capacity, mental and/or emotional distress, loss of quality of life, disfigurement and more. These damages need not be set forth in statute as they already exist in the tradition of common law. However, without a wrongful death statute, most of them are extinguished upon death.

In the United States, the power of the federal judiciary to review and invalidate unconstitutional acts of the federal executive branch is stated in the constitution, Article III sections 1 and 2: "The judicial Power of the United States, shall be vested in one supreme Court, and in such inferior Courts as the Congress may from time to time ordain and establish. ... The judicial Power shall extend to all Cases, in Law and Equity, arising under this Constitution, the Laws of the United States, and Treaties made, or which shall be made, under their Authority". The first landmark decision on "the judicial power" was Marbury v. Madison, . Later cases interpreted the "judicial power" of Article III to establish the power of federal courts to consider or overturn any action of Congress or of any state that conflicts with the Constitution.

The interactions between decisions of different courts is discussed further in the article on precedent.  Further interactions between common law and either statute or regulation are discussed further in the articles on Skidmore deference, Chevron deference, and Auer deference.

Overruling precedent—the limits of stare decisis 
The United States federal courts are divided into twelve regional circuits, each with a circuit court of appeals (plus a thirteenth, the Court of Appeals for the Federal Circuit, which hears appeals in patent cases and cases against the federal government, without geographic limitation). Decisions of one circuit court are binding on the district courts within the circuit and on the circuit court itself, but are only persuasive authority on sister circuits. District court decisions are not binding precedent at all, only persuasive.

Most of the U.S. federal courts of appeal have adopted a rule under which, in the event of any conflict in decisions of panels (most of the courts of appeal almost always sit in panels of three), the earlier panel decision is controlling, and a panel decision may only be overruled by the court of appeals sitting en banc (that is, all active judges of the court) or by a higher court. In these courts, the older decision remains controlling when an issue comes up the third time.

Other courts, for example, the Court of Customs and Patent Appeals and the Supreme Court, always sit en banc, and thus the later decision controls. These courts essentially overrule all previous cases in each new case, and older cases survive only to the extent they do not conflict with newer cases. The interpretations of these courts—for example, Supreme Court interpretations of the constitution or federal statutes—are stable only so long as the older interpretation maintains the support of a majority of the court. Older decisions persist through some combination of belief that the old decision is right, and that it is not sufficiently wrong to be overruled.

In the jurisdictions of England and Wales and of Northern Ireland, since 2009, the Supreme Court of the United Kingdom has the authority to overrule and unify criminal law decisions of lower courts; it is the final court of appeal for civil law cases in all three of the UK jurisdictions, but not for criminal law cases in Scotland, where the High Court of Justiciary has this power instead (except on questions of law relating to reserved matters such as devolution and human rights). From 1966 to 2009, this power lay with the House of Lords, granted by the Practice Statement of 1966.

Canada's federal system, described below, avoids regional variability of federal law by giving national jurisdiction to both layers of appellate courts.

Common law as a foundation for commercial economies 

The reliance on judicial opinion is a strength of common law systems, and is a significant contributor to the robust commercial systems in the United Kingdom and United States. Because there is reasonably precise guidance on almost every issue, parties (especially commercial parties) can predict whether a proposed course of action is likely to be lawful or unlawful, and have some assurance of consistency. As Justice Brandeis famously expressed it, "in most matters it is more important that the applicable rule of law be settled than that it be settled right." This ability to predict gives more freedom to come close to the boundaries of the law. For example, many commercial contracts are more economically efficient, and create greater wealth, because the parties know ahead of time that the proposed arrangement, though perhaps close to the line, is almost certainly legal. Newspapers, taxpayer-funded entities with some religious affiliation, and political parties can obtain fairly clear guidance on the boundaries within which their freedom of expression rights apply.

In contrast, in jurisdictions with very weak respect for precedent, fine questions of law are redetermined anew each time they arise, making consistency and prediction more difficult, and procedures far more protracted than necessary because parties cannot rely on written statements of law as reliable guides. In jurisdictions that do not have a strong allegiance to a large body of precedent, parties have less a priori guidance (unless the written law is very clear and kept updated) and must often leave a bigger "safety margin" of unexploited opportunities, and final determinations are reached only after far larger expenditures on legal fees by the parties.

This is the reason for the frequent choice of the law of the State of New York in commercial contracts, even when neither entity has extensive contacts with New York—and remarkably often even when neither party has contacts with the United States. Commercial contracts almost always include a "choice of law clause" to reduce uncertainty. Somewhat surprisingly, contracts throughout the world (for example, contracts involving parties in Japan, France and Germany, and from most of the other states of the United States) often choose the law of New York, even where the relationship of the parties and transaction to New York is quite attenuated. Because of its history as the United States' commercial center, New York common law has a depth and predictability not (yet) available in any other jurisdictions of the United States. Similarly, American corporations are often formed under Delaware corporate law, and American contracts relating to corporate law issues (merger and acquisitions of companies, rights of shareholders, and so on) include a Delaware choice of law clause, because of the deep body of law in Delaware on these issues. On the other hand, some other jurisdictions have sufficiently developed bodies of law so that parties have no real motivation to choose the law of a foreign jurisdiction (for example, England and Wales, and the state of California), but not yet so fully developed that parties with no relationship to the jurisdiction choose that law. Outside the United States, parties that are in different jurisdictions from each other often choose the law of England and Wales, particularly when the parties are each in former British colonies and members of the Commonwealth. The common theme in all cases is that commercial parties seek predictability and simplicity in their contractual relations, and frequently choose the law of a common law jurisdiction with a well-developed body of common law to achieve that result.

Likewise, for litigation of commercial disputes arising out of unpredictable torts (as opposed to the prospective choice of law clauses in contracts discussed in the previous paragraph), certain jurisdictions attract an unusually high fraction of cases, because of the predictability afforded by the depth of decided cases. For example, London is considered the pre-eminent centre for litigation of admiralty cases.

This is not to say that common law is better in every situation. For example, civil law can be clearer than case law when the legislature has had the foresight and diligence to address the precise set of facts applicable to a particular situation. For that reason, civil law statutes tend to be somewhat more detailed than statutes written by common law legislatures—but, conversely, that tends to make the statute more difficult to read (the United States tax code is an example).

History

Origins 
The common lawso named because it was "common" to all the king's courts across Englandoriginated in the practices of the courts of the English kings in the centuries following the Norman Conquest in 1066.  Prior to the Norman Conquest, much of England's legal business took place in the local folk courts of its various shires and hundreds.  A variety of other individual courts also existed across the land: urban boroughs and merchant fairs held their own courts, and large landholders also held their own manorial and seigniorial courts as needed. The degree to which common law drew from earlier Anglo-Saxon traditions such as the jury, ordeals, the penalty of outlawry, and writs  all of which were incorporated into the Norman common law  is still a subject of much discussion. Additionally, the Catholic Church operated its own court system that adjudicated issues of canon law.

The main sources for the history of the common law in the Middle Ages are the plea rolls and the Year Books. The plea rolls, which were the official court records for the Courts of Common Pleas and King's Bench, were written in Latin. The rolls were made up in bundles by law term: Hilary, Easter, Trinity, and Michaelmas, or winter, spring, summer, and autumn. They are currently deposited in the UK National Archives, by whose permission images of the rolls for the Courts of Common Pleas, King's Bench, and Exchequer of Pleas, from the 13th century to the 17th, can be viewed online at the Anglo-American Legal Tradition site (The O'Quinn Law Library of the University of Houston Law Center).

The doctrine of precedent developed during the 12th and 13th centuries, as the collective judicial decisions that were based in tradition, custom and precedent.

The form of reasoning used in common law is known as casuistry or case-based reasoning. The common law, as applied in civil cases (as distinct from criminal cases), was devised as a means of compensating someone for wrongful acts known as torts, including both intentional torts and torts caused by negligence, and as developing the body of law recognizing and regulating contracts. The type of procedure practiced in common law courts is known as the adversarial system; this is also a development of the common law.

Medieval English common law 

In 1154, Henry II became the first Plantagenet king. Among many achievements, Henry institutionalized common law by creating a unified system of law "common" to the country through incorporating and elevating local custom to the national, ending local control and peculiarities, eliminating arbitrary remedies and reinstating a jury system—citizens sworn on oath to investigate reliable criminal accusations and civil claims. The jury reached its verdict through evaluating common local knowledge, not necessarily through the presentation of evidence, a distinguishing factor from today's civil and criminal court systems.

At the time, royal government centered on the Curia Regis (king's court), the body of aristocrats and prelates who assisted in the administration of the realm and the ancestor of Parliament, the Star Chamber, and Privy Council. Henry II developed the practice of sending judges (numbering around 20 to 30 in the 1180s) from his Curia Regis to hear the various disputes throughout the country, and return to the court thereafter. The king's itinerant justices would generally receive a writ or commission under the great seal. They would then resolve disputes on an ad hoc basis according to what they interpreted the customs to be. The king's judges would then return to London and often discuss their cases and the decisions they made with the other judges. These decisions would be recorded and filed. In time, a rule, known as stare decisis (also commonly known as precedent) developed, whereby a judge would be bound to follow the decision of an earlier judge; he was required to adopt the earlier judge's interpretation of the law and apply the same principles promulgated by that earlier judge if the two cases had similar facts to one another. Once judges began to regard each other's decisions to be binding precedent, the pre-Norman system of local customs and law varying in each locality was replaced by a system that was (at least in theory, though not always in practice) common throughout the whole country, hence the name "common law".

The king's object was to preserve public order, but providing law and order was also extremely profitable–cases on forest use as well as fines and forfeitures can generate "great treasure" for the government. Eyres (a Norman French word for judicial circuit, originating from Latin iter) are more than just courts; they would supervise local government, raise revenue, investigate crimes, and enforce feudal rights of the king. There were complaints that the eyre of 1198 reducing the kingdom to poverty and Cornishmen fleeing to escape the eyre of 1233.

Henry II's creation of a powerful and unified court system, which curbed somewhat the power of canonical (church) courts, brought him (and England) into conflict with the church, most famously with Thomas Becket, the Archbishop of Canterbury. The murder of the Archbishop gave rise to a wave of popular outrage against the King. International pressure on Henry grew, and in May 1172 he negotiated a settlement with the papacy in which the King swore to go on crusade as well as effectively overturned the more controversial clauses of the Constitutions of Clarendon. Henry nevertheless continued to exert influence in any ecclesiastical case which interested him and royal power was exercised more subtly with considerable success.

The English Court of Common Pleas was established after Magna Carta to try lawsuits between commoners in which the monarch had no interest. Its judges sat in open court in the Great Hall of the king's Palace of Westminster, permanently except in the vacations between the four terms of the Legal year.

Judge-made common law operated as the primary source of law for several hundred years, before Parliament acquired legislative powers to create statutory law. It is important to understand that common law is the older and more traditional source of law, and legislative power is simply a layer applied on top of the older common law foundation. Since the 12th century, courts have had parallel and co-equal authority to make law—"legislating from the bench" is a traditional and essential function of courts, which was carried over into the U.S. system as an essential component of the "judicial power" specified by Article III of the U.S. Constitution. Justice Oliver Wendell Holmes Jr. summarized centuries of history in 1917, "judges do and must legislate." In the United States, state courts continue to exercise full common law powers, and create both general common law and interstitial common law. In U.S. federal courts, after Erie R. Co. v. Tompkins, 304 U.S. 64, 78 (1938), the general dividing line is that federal courts can only "interpret" to create  interstitial common law not exercise general common law powers. However, that authority to "interpret" can be an expansive power to "make law," especially on Constitutional issues where the Constitutional text is so terse.  There are legitimate debates on how the powers of courts and legislatures should be balanced around "interpretation."  However, the view that courts lack law-making power is historically inaccurate and constitutionally unsupportable.

In England, judges have devised a number of rules as to how to deal with precedent decisions. The early development of case-law in the thirteenth century has been traced to Bracton's On the Laws and Customs of England and led to the yearly compilations of court cases known as Year Books, of which the first extant was published in 1268, the same year that Bracton died. The Year Books are known as the law reports of medieval England, and are a principal source for knowledge of the developing legal doctrines, concepts, and methods in the period from the 13th to the 16th centuries, when the common law developed into recognizable form.

Influence of Roman law 
The term "common law" is often used as a contrast to Roman-derived "civil law", and the fundamental processes and forms of reasoning in the two are quite different. Nonetheless, there has been considerable cross-fertilization of ideas, while the two traditions and sets of foundational principles remain distinct.

By the time of the rediscovery of the Roman law in Europe in the 12th and 13th centuries, the common law had already developed far enough to prevent a Roman law reception as it occurred on the continent. However, the first common law scholars, most notably Glanvill and Bracton, as well as the early royal common law judges, had been well accustomed with Roman law. Often, they were clerics trained in the Roman canon law. One of the first and throughout its history one of the most significant treatises of the common law, Bracton's De Legibus et Consuetudinibus Angliae (On the Laws and Customs of England), was heavily influenced by the division of the law in Justinian's Institutes. The impact of Roman law had decreased sharply after the age of Bracton, but the Roman divisions of actions into in rem (typically, actions against a thing or property for the purpose of gaining title to that property; must be filed in a court where the property is located) and in personam (typically, actions directed against a person; these can affect a person's rights and, since a person often owns things, his property too) used by Bracton had a lasting effect and laid the groundwork for a return of Roman law structural concepts in the 18th and 19th centuries. Signs of this can be found in Blackstone's Commentaries on the Laws of England, and Roman law ideas regained importance with the revival of academic law schools in the 19th century. As a result, today, the main systematic divisions of the law into property, contract, and tort (and to some extent unjust enrichment) can be found in the civil law as well as in the common law.

Coke and Blackstone 

The first attempt at a comprehensive compilation of centuries of common law was by Lord Chief Justice Edward Coke, in his treatise, Institutes of the Lawes of England in the 17th century.

The next definitive historical treatise on the common law is Commentaries on the Laws of England, written by Sir William Blackstone and first published in 1765–1769.

Propagation of the common law to the colonies and Commonwealth by reception statutes 

A reception statute is a statutory law adopted as a former British colony becomes independent, by which the new nation adopts (i.e. receives) pre-independence common law, to the extent not explicitly rejected by the legislative body or constitution of the new nation. Reception statutes generally consider the English common law dating prior to independence, and the precedent originating from it, as the default law, because of the importance of using an extensive and predictable body of law to govern the conduct of citizens and businesses in a new state. All U.S. states, with the partial exception of Louisiana, have either implemented reception statutes or adopted the common law by judicial opinion.

Other examples of reception statutes in the United States, the states of the U.S., Canada and its provinces, and Hong Kong, are discussed in the reception statute article.

Yet, adoption of the common law in the newly independent nation was not a foregone conclusion, and was controversial. Immediately after the American Revolution, there was widespread distrust and hostility to anything British, and the common law was no exception. Jeffersonians decried lawyers and their common law tradition as threats to the new republic. The Jeffersonians preferred a legislatively enacted civil law under the control of the political process, rather than the common law developed by judges that—by design—were insulated from the political process. The Federalists believed that the common law was the birthright of Independence: after all, the natural rights to "life, liberty, and the pursuit of happiness" were the rights protected by common law. Even advocates for the common law approach noted that it was not an ideal fit for the newly independent colonies: judges and lawyers alike were severely hindered by a lack of printed legal materials. Before Independence, the most comprehensive law libraries had been maintained by Tory lawyers, and those libraries vanished with the loyalist expatriation, and the ability to print books was limited. Lawyer (later President) John Adams complained that he "suffered very much for the want of books". To bootstrap this most basic need of a common law system—knowable, written law—in 1803, lawyers in Massachusetts donated their books to found a law library.  A Jeffersonian newspaper criticized the library, as it would carry forward "all the old authorities practiced in England for centuries back ... whereby a new system of jurisprudence [will be founded] on the high monarchical system [to] become the Common Law of this Commonwealth... [The library] may hereafter have a very unsocial purpose."

For several decades after independence, English law still exerted influence over American common law—for example, with Byrne v Boadle (1863), which first applied the res ipsa loquitur doctrine.

Decline of Latin maxims and "blind imitation of the past", and adding flexibility to stare decisis  
Well into the 19th century, ancient maxims played a large role in common law adjudication. Many of these maxims had originated in Roman Law, migrated to England before the introduction of Christianity to the British Isles, and were typically stated in Latin even in English decisions. Many examples are familiar in everyday speech even today, "One cannot be a judge in one's own cause" (see Dr. Bonham's Case), rights are reciprocal to obligations, and the like. Judicial decisions and treatises of the 17th and 18th centuries, such at those of Lord Chief Justice Edward Coke, presented the common law as a collection of such maxims.

Reliance on old maxims and rigid adherence to precedent, no matter how old or ill-considered, came under critical discussion in the late 19th century, starting in the United States. Oliver Wendell Holmes Jr. in his famous article, "The Path of the Law", commented, "It is revolting to have no better reason for a rule of law than that so it was laid down in the time of Henry IV. It is still more revolting if the grounds upon which it was laid down have vanished long since, and the rule simply persists from blind imitation of the past." Justice Holmes noted that study of maxims might be sufficient for "the man of the present", but "the man of the future is the man of statistics and the master of economics". In an 1880 lecture at Harvard, he wrote:

In the early 20th century, Louis Brandeis, later appointed to the United States Supreme Court, became noted for his use of policy-driving facts and economics in his briefs, and extensive appendices presenting facts that lead a judge to the advocate's conclusion. By this time, briefs relied more on facts than on Latin maxims.

Reliance on old maxims is now deprecated. Common law decisions today reflect both precedent and policy judgment drawn from economics, the social sciences, business, decisions of foreign courts, and the like. The degree to which these external factors should influence adjudication is the subject of active debate, but it is indisputable that judges do draw on experience and learning from everyday life, from other fields, and from other jurisdictions.

1870 through 20th century, and the procedural merger of law and equity 

As early as the 15th century, it became the practice that litigants who felt they had been cheated by the common law system would petition the King in person. For example, they might argue that an award of damages (at common law (as opposed to equity)) was not sufficient redress for a trespasser occupying their land, and instead request that the trespasser be evicted. From this developed the system of equity, administered by the Lord Chancellor, in the courts of chancery. By their nature, equity and law were frequently in conflict and litigation would frequently continue for years as one court countermanded the other, even though it was established by the 17th century that equity should prevail.

In England, courts of law (as opposed to equity) were combined with courts of equity by the Judicature Acts of 1873 and 1875, with equity prevailing in case of conflict.

In the United States, parallel systems of law (providing money damages, with cases heard by a jury upon either party's request) and equity (fashioning a remedy to fit the situation, including injunctive relief, heard by a judge) survived well into the 20th century. The United States federal courts procedurally separated law and equity: the same judges could hear either kind of case, but a given case could only pursue causes in law or in equity, and the two kinds of cases proceeded under different procedural rules. This became problematic when a given case required both money damages and injunctive relief. In 1937, the new Federal Rules of Civil Procedure combined law and equity into one form of action, the "civil action". Fed.R.Civ.P. . The distinction survives to the extent that issues that were "common law (as opposed to equity)" as of 1791 (the date of adoption of the Seventh Amendment) are still subject to the right of either party to request a jury, and "equity" issues are decided by a judge.

The states of Delaware, Illinois, Mississippi, South Carolina, and Tennessee continue to have divided courts of law and courts of chancery, for example, the Delaware Court of Chancery. In New Jersey, the appellate courts are unified, but the trial courts are organized into a Chancery Division and a Law Division.

Common law pleading and its abolition in the early 20th century 

For centuries, through to the 19th century, the common law recognized only specific forms of action, and required very careful drafting of the opening pleading (called a writ) to slot into exactly one of them: debt, detinue, covenant, special assumpsit, general assumpsit, trespass, trover, replevin, case (or trespass on the case), and ejectment. To initiate a lawsuit, a pleading had to be drafted to meet myriad technical requirements: correctly categorizing the case into the correct legal pigeonhole (pleading in the alternative was not permitted), and using specific "magic words" encrusted over the centuries. Under the old common law pleading standards, a suit by a pro se ("for oneself", without a lawyer) party was all but impossible, and there was often considerable procedural jousting at the outset of a case over minor wording issues.

One of the major reforms of the late 19th century and early 20th century was the abolition of common law pleading requirements. A plaintiff can initiate a case by giving the defendant "a short and plain statement" of facts that constitute an alleged wrong. This reform moved the attention of courts from technical scrutiny of words to a more rational consideration of the facts, and opened access to justice far more broadly.

Alternatives to common law systems

Civil law systems—comparisons and contrasts to common law 

The main alternative to the common law system is the civil law system, which is used in Continental Europe, and most of Central and South America.

Judicial decisions play only a minor role in shaping civil law 
The primary contrast between the two systems is the role of written decisions and precedent.

In common law jurisdictions, nearly every case that presents a bona fide disagreement on the law is resolved in a written opinion. The legal reasoning for the decision, known as ratio decidendi, not only determines the court's judgment between the parties, but also stands as precedent for resolving future disputes. In contrast, civil law decisions typically do not include explanatory opinions, and thus no precedent flows from one decision to the next.
In common law systems, a single decided case is binding common law (connotation 1) to the same extent as statute or regulation, under the principle of stare decisis. In contrast, in civil law systems, individual decisions have only advisory, not binding effect. In civil law systems, case law only acquires weight when a long series of cases use consistent reasoning, called jurisprudence constante. Civil law lawyers consult case law to obtain their best prediction of how a court will rule, but comparatively, civil law judges are less bound to follow it.

For that reason, statutes in civil law systems are more comprehensive, detailed, and continuously updated, covering all matters capable of being brought before a court.

Adversarial system vs. inquisitorial system 
Common law systems tend to give more weight to separation of powers between the judicial branch and the executive branch. In contrast, civil law systems are typically more tolerant of allowing individual officials to exercise both powers.  One example of this contrast is the difference between the two systems in allocation of responsibility between prosecutor and adjudicator.

Common law courts usually use an adversarial system, in which two sides present their cases to a neutral judge. In contrast, in civil law systems, criminal proceedings proceed under an inquisitorial system in which an examining magistrate serves two roles by developing the evidence and arguments for one side and then the other during the investigation phase.

The examining magistrate then presents the dossier detailing his or her findings to the president of the bench that will adjudicate on the case where it has been decided that a trial shall be conducted. Therefore, the president of the bench's view of the case is not neutral and may be biased while conducting the trial after the reading of the dossier. Unlike the common law proceedings, the president of the bench in the inquisitorial system is not merely an umpire and is entitled to directly interview the witnesses or express comments during the trial, as long as he or she does not express his or her view on the guilt of the accused.

The proceeding in the inquisitorial system is essentially by writing. Most of the witnesses would have given evidence in the investigation phase and such evidence will be contained in the dossier under the form of police reports. In the same way, the accused would have already put his or her case at the investigation phase but he or she will be free to change his or her evidence at trial. Whether the accused pleads guilty or not, a trial will be conducted. Unlike the adversarial system, the conviction and sentence to be served (if any) will be released by the trial jury together with the president of the trial bench, following their common deliberation.

In contrast, in an adversarial system, the onus of framing the case rests on the parties, and judges generally decide the case presented to them, rather than acting as active investigators, or actively reframing the issues presented.  "In our adversary system, in both civil and criminal cases, in the first instance and on appeal, we follow the principle of party presentation. That is, we rely on the parties to frame the issues for decision and assign to courts the role of neutral arbiter of matters the parties present."  This principle applies with force in all issues in criminal matters, and to factual issues: courts seldom engage in fact gathering on their own initiative, but decide facts on the evidence presented (even here, there are exceptions, for "legislative facts" as opposed to "adjudicative facts").   On the other hand, on issues of law, courts regularly raise new issues (such as matters of jurisdiction or standing), perform independent research, and reformulate the legal grounds on which to analyze the facts presented to them.  The United States Supreme Court regularly decides based on issues raised only in amicus briefs from non-parties.  One of the most notable such cases was Erie Railroad v. Tompkins, a 1938 case in which neither party questioned the ruling from the 1842 case Swift v. Tyson that served as the foundation for their arguments, but which led the Supreme Court to overturn Swift during their deliberations.  To avoid lack of notice, courts may invite briefing on an issue to ensure adequate notice.  However, there are limits—an appeals court may not introduce a theory that contradicts the party's own contentions.

There are many exceptions in both directions. For example, most proceedings before U.S. federal and state agencies are inquisitorial in nature, at least the initial stages (e.g., a patent examiner, a social security hearing officer, and so on), even though the law to be applied is developed through common law processes.

Contrasting role of treatises and academic writings in common law and civil law systems 
The role of the legal academy presents a significant "cultural" difference between common law (connotation 2) and civil law jurisdictions.  In both systems, treatises compile decisions and state overarching principles that (in the author's opinion) explain the results of the cases.  In neither system are treatises considered "law," but the weight given them is nonetheless quite different.

In common law jurisdictions, lawyers and judges tend to use these treatises as only "finding aids" to locate the relevant cases. In common law jurisdictions, scholarly work is seldom cited as authority for what the law is.  Chief Justice Roberts noted the "great disconnect between the academy and the profession." When common law courts rely on scholarly work, it is almost always only for factual findings, policy justification, or the history and evolution of the law, but the court's legal conclusion is reached through analysis of relevant statutes and common law, seldom scholarly commentary.

In contrast, in civil law jurisdictions, courts give the writings of law professors significant weight, partly because civil law decisions traditionally were very brief, sometimes no more than a paragraph stating who wins and who loses. The rationale had to come from somewhere else: the academy often filled that role.

Narrowing of differences between common law and civil law 
The contrast between civil law and common law legal systems has become increasingly blurred, with the growing importance of jurisprudence (similar to case law but not binding) in civil law countries, and the growing importance of statute law and codes in common law countries.

Examples of common law being replaced by statute or codified rule in the United States include criminal law (since 1812, U.S. federal courts and most but not all of the states have held that criminal law must be embodied in statute if the public is to have fair notice), commercial law (the Uniform Commercial Code in the early 1960s) and procedure (the Federal Rules of Civil Procedure in the 1930s and the Federal Rules of Evidence in the 1970s). But note that in each case, the statute sets the general principles, but the interstitial common law process determines the scope and application of the statute.

An example of convergence from the other direction is shown in the 1982 decision Srl CILFIT and Lanificio di Gavardo SpA v Ministry of Health, in which the European Court of Justice held that questions it has already answered need not be resubmitted. This showed how a historically distinctly common law principle is used by a court composed of judges (at that time) of essentially civil law jurisdiction.

Other alternatives 

The former Soviet Bloc and other socialist countries used a socialist law system, although there is controversy as to whether socialist law ever constituted a separate legal system or not.

Much of the Muslim world uses legal systems based on Sharia (also called Islamic law).

Many churches use a system of canon law. The canon law of the Catholic Church influenced the common law during the medieval period through its preservation of Roman law doctrine such as the presumption of innocence.

Common law legal systems in the present day

In jurisdictions around the world 
The common law constitutes the basis of the legal systems of:
 Australia (both federally and in each of the States and Territories),
 Bangladesh,
 Belize,
 Brunei,
 Canada (both federal and the individual provinces, with the exception of Quebec),
 the Caribbean jurisdictions of Antigua and Barbuda, Barbados, Bahamas, Dominica, Grenada, Jamaica, St Vincent and the Grenadines, Saint Kitts and Nevis, Trinidad and Tobago,
 Cyprus
Ghana,
 Hong Kong,
 India (except the state of Goa),
 Ireland,
 Israel,
 Kenya,
 Nigeria,
 Malaysia,
 Malta
 Myanmar,
 New Zealand,
 Pakistan,
 Philippines, 
 Singapore,
 South Africa,
 United Kingdom (both in England, Scotland, Wales and Northern Ireland),
 United States (both the federal system and the individual states and Territories, with the partial exception of Louisiana and Puerto Rico),

and many other generally English-speaking countries or Commonwealth countries (except the UK's Scotland, which is bijuridicial, and Malta). Essentially, every country that was colonised at some time by England, Great Britain, or the United Kingdom uses common law except those that were formerly colonised by other nations, such as Quebec (which follows the bijuridicial law or civil code of France in part), South Africa and Sri Lanka (which follow Roman Dutch law), where the prior civil law system was retained to respect the civil rights of the local colonists. Guyana and Saint Lucia have mixed Common Law and Civil Law systems.

The remainder of this section discusses jurisdiction-specific variants, arranged chronologically.

Scotland 
Scotland is often said to use the civil law system, but it has a unique system that combines elements of an uncodified civil law dating back to the Corpus Juris Civilis with an element of its own common law long predating the Treaty of Union with England in 1707 (see Legal institutions of Scotland in the High Middle Ages), founded on the customary laws of the tribes residing there. Historically, Scottish common law differed in that the use of precedent was subject to the courts' seeking to discover the principle that justifies a law rather than searching for an example as a precedent, and principles of natural justice and fairness have always played a role in Scots Law. From the 19th century, the Scottish approach to precedent developed into a stare decisis akin to that already established in England thereby reflecting a narrower, more modern approach to the application of case law in subsequent instances. This is not to say that the substantive rules of the common laws of both countries are the same, but in many matters (particularly those of UK-wide interest), they are similar.

Scotland shares the Supreme Court with England, Wales and Northern Ireland for civil cases; the court's decisions are binding on the jurisdiction from which a case arises but only influential on similar cases arising in Scotland. This has had the effect of converging the law in certain areas. For instance, the modern UK law of negligence is based on Donoghue v Stevenson, a case originating in Paisley, Scotland.

Scotland maintains a separate criminal law system from the rest of the UK, with the High Court of Justiciary being the final court for criminal appeals. The highest court of appeal in civil cases brought in Scotland is now the Supreme Court of the United Kingdom (before October 2009, final appellate jurisdiction lay with the House of Lords).

The United States -- its states, federal courts, and executive branch agencies (17th century on) 
The centuries-old authority of the common law courts in England to develop law case by case and to apply statute law—"legislating from the bench"—is a traditional function of courts, which was carried over into the U.S. system as an essential component of the "judicial power" for states. Justice Oliver Wendell Holmes Jr. summarized centuries of history in 1917, "judges do and must legislate” (in the federal courts, only interstitially, in state courts, to the full limits of common law adjudicatory authority).

New York (17th century)
The original colony of New Netherland was settled by the Dutch and the law was also Dutch. When the English captured pre-existing colonies they continued to allow the local settlers to keep their civil law. However, the Dutch settlers revolted against the English and the colony was recaptured by the Dutch. In 1664, the colony of New York had two distinct legal systems: on Manhattan Island and along the Hudson River, sophisticated courts modeled on those of the Netherlands were resolving disputes learnedly in accordance with Dutch customary law. On Long Island, Staten Island, and in Westchester, on the other hand, English courts were administering a crude, untechnical variant of the common law carried from Puritan New England and practiced without the intercession of lawyers.  When the English finally regained control of New Netherland they imposed common law upon all the colonists, including the Dutch. This was problematic, as the patroon system of land holding, based on the feudal system and civil law, continued to operate in the colony until it was abolished in the mid-19th century. New York began a codification of its law in the 19th century. The only part of this codification process that was considered complete is known as the Field Code applying to civil procedure.  The influence of Roman-Dutch law continued in the colony well into the late 19th century. The codification of a law of general obligations shows how remnants of the civil law tradition in New York continued on from the Dutch days.

Louisiana (1700s) 

Under Louisiana's codified system, the Louisiana Civil Code, private law—that is, substantive law between private sector parties—is based on principles of law from continental Europe, with some common law influences. These principles derive ultimately from Roman law, transmitted through French law and Spanish law, as the state's current territory intersects the area of North America colonized by Spain and by France. Contrary to popular belief, the Louisiana code does not directly derive from the Napoleonic Code, as the latter was enacted in 1804, one year after the Louisiana Purchase. However, the two codes are similar in many respects due to common roots.

Louisiana's criminal law largely rests on English common law. Louisiana's administrative law is generally similar to the administrative law of the U.S. federal government and other U.S. states. Louisiana's procedural law is generally in line with that of other U.S. states, which in turn is generally based on the U.S. Federal Rules of Civil Procedure.

Historically notable among the Louisiana code's differences from common law is the role of property rights among women, particularly in inheritance gained by widows.

California (1850s) 
The U.S. state of California has a system based on common law, but it has codified the law in the manner of civil law jurisdictions. The reason for the enactment of the California Codes in the 19th century was to replace a pre-existing system based on Spanish civil law with a system based on common law, similar to that in most other states. California and a number of other Western states, however, have retained the concept of community property derived from civil law. The California courts have treated portions of the codes as an extension of the common-law tradition, subject to judicial development in the same manner as judge-made common law. (Most notably, in the case Li v. Yellow Cab Co., 13 Cal.3d 804 (1975), the California Supreme Court adopted the principle of comparative negligence in the face of a California Civil Code provision codifying the traditional common-law doctrine of contributory negligence.)

United States federal courts (1789 and 1938) 

The United States federal government (as opposed to the states) has a variant on a common law system. United States federal courts only act as interpreters of statutes and the constitution by elaborating and precisely defining broad statutory language (connotation 1(b) above), but, unlike state courts, do not generally act as an independent source of common law.

Before 1938, the federal courts, like almost all other common law courts, decided the law on any issue where the relevant legislature (either the U.S. Congress or state legislature, depending on the issue), had not acted, by looking to courts in the same system, that is, other federal courts, even on issues of state law, and even where there was no express grant of authority from Congress or the Constitution.

In 1938, the U.S. Supreme Court in Erie Railroad Co. v. Tompkins 304 U.S. 64, 78 (1938), overruled earlier precedent, and held "There is no federal general common law," thus confining the federal courts to act only as interstitial interpreters of law originating elsewhere. E.g., Texas Industries v. Radcliff,  (without an express grant of statutory authority, federal courts cannot create rules of intuitive justice, for example, a right to contribution from co-conspirators). Post-1938, federal courts deciding issues that arise under state law are required to defer to state court interpretations of state statutes, or reason what a state's highest court would rule if presented with the issue, or to certify the question to the state's highest court for resolution.

Later courts have limited Erie slightly, to create a few situations where United States federal courts are permitted to create federal common law rules without express statutory authority, for example, where a federal rule of decision is necessary to protect uniquely federal interests, such as foreign affairs, or financial instruments issued by the federal government. See, e.g., Clearfield Trust Co. v. United States,  (giving federal courts the authority to fashion common law rules with respect to issues of federal power, in this case negotiable instruments backed by the federal government); see also International News Service v. Associated Press, 248 U.S. 215 (1918) (creating a cause of action for misappropriation of "hot news" that lacks any statutory grounding); but see National Basketball Association v. Motorola, Inc., 105 F.3d 841, 843–44, 853 (2d Cir. 1997) (noting continued vitality of INS "hot news" tort under New York state law, but leaving open the question of whether it survives under federal law). Except on Constitutional issues, Congress is free to legislatively overrule federal courts' common law.

United States executive branch agencies (1946) 
Most executive branch agencies in the United States federal government have some adjudicatory authority. To greater or lesser extent, agencies honor their own precedent to ensure consistent results. Agency decision making is governed by the Administrative Procedure Act of 1946.

For example, the National Labor Relations Board issues relatively few regulations, but instead promulgates most of its substantive rules through common law (connotation 1).

India, Pakistan, and Bangladesh (19th century and 1948) 
The law of India, Pakistan, and Bangladesh are largely based on English common law because of the long period of British colonial influence during the period of the British Raj.

Ancient India represented a distinct tradition of law, and had a historically independent school of legal theory and practice. The Arthashastra, dating from 400 BCE and the Manusmriti, from 100 CE, were influential treatises in India, texts that were considered authoritative legal guidance. Manu's central philosophy was tolerance and pluralism, and was cited across Southeast Asia. Early in this period, which finally culminated in the creation of the Gupta Empire, relations with ancient Greece and Rome were not infrequent. The appearance of similar fundamental institutions of international law in various parts of the world show that they are inherent in international society, irrespective of culture and tradition. Inter-State relations in the pre-Islamic period resulted in clear-cut rules of warfare of a high humanitarian standard, in rules of neutrality, of treaty law, of customary law embodied in religious charters, in exchange of embassies of a temporary or semi-permanent character.

When India became part of the British Empire, there was a break in tradition, and Hindu and Islamic law were supplanted by the common law. After the failed rebellion against the British in 1857, the British Parliament took over control of India from the British East India Company, and British India came under the direct rule of the Crown. The British Parliament passed the Government of India Act 1858 to this effect, which set up the structure of British government in India. It established in Britain the office of the Secretary of State for India through whom the Parliament would exercise its rule, along with a Council of India to aid him. It also established the office of the Governor-General of India along with an Executive Council in India, which consisted of high officials of the British Government. As a result, the present judicial system of the country derives largely from the British system and has little correlation to the institutions of the pre-British era.

Post-partition India (1948) 

Post-partition, India retained its common law system. Much of contemporary Indian law shows substantial European and American influence. Legislation first introduced by the British is still in effect in modified form today. During the drafting of the Indian Constitution, laws from Ireland, the United States, Britain, and France were all synthesized to produce a refined set of Indian laws. Indian laws also adhere to the United Nations guidelines on human rights law and environmental law. Certain international trade laws, such as those on intellectual property, are also enforced in India.

The exception to this rule is in the state of Goa, annexed in stages in the 1960s through 1980s. In Goa, a Portuguese uniform civil code is in place, in which all religions have a common law regarding marriages, divorces and adoption.

Post-partition Pakistan (1948) 

Post-partition, Pakistan retained its common law system.

Post-partition Bangladesh (1968) 

Post-partition, Bangladesh retained its common law system.

Canada (1867) 

Canada has separate federal and provincial legal systems.

Canadian provincial legal systems 

Each province and territory is considered a separate jurisdiction with respect to case law. Each has its own procedural law in civil matters, statutorily created provincial courts and superior trial courts with inherent jurisdiction culminating in the Court of Appeal of the province. These Courts of Appeal are then subject to the Supreme Court of Canada in terms of appeal of their decisions.

All but one of the provinces of Canada use a common law system for civil matters (the exception being Quebec, which uses a French-heritage civil law system for issues arising within provincial jurisdiction, such as property ownership and contracts).

Canadian federal legal system

Canadian Federal Courts operate under a separate system throughout Canada and deal with narrower range of subject matter than superior courts in each province and territory. They only hear cases on subjects assigned to them by federal statutes, such as immigration, intellectual property, judicial review of federal government decisions, and admiralty. The Federal Court of Appeal is the appellate court for federal courts and hears cases in multiple cities; unlike the United States, the Canadian Federal Court of Appeal is not divided into appellate circuits.

Canadian federal statutes must use the terminology of both the common law and civil law for civil matters; this is referred to as legislative bijuralism.

Canadian criminal law 
Criminal law is uniform throughout Canada. It is based on the federal statutory Criminal Code, which in addition to substance also details procedural law. The administration of justice are the responsibilities of the provinces. Canadian criminal law uses a common law system no matter which province a case proceeds.

Nicaragua 
Nicaragua's legal system is also a mixture of the English Common Law and Civil Law. This situation was brought through the influence of British administration of the Eastern half of the Mosquito Coast from the mid-17th century until about 1894, the William Walker period from about 1855 through 1857, US interventions/occupations during the period from 1909 to 1933, the influence of US institutions during the Somoza family administrations (1933 through 1979) and the considerable importation between 1979 and the present of US culture and institutions.

Israel (1948) 
Israel has no formal written constitution.  Its basic principles are inherited from the law of the British Mandate of Palestine and thus resemble those of British and American law, namely: the role of courts in creating the body of law and the authority of the supreme court in reviewing and if necessary overturning legislative and executive decisions, as well as employing the adversarial system.  However, because Israel has no written constitution, basic laws can be changed by a vote of 61 out of 120 votes in the parliament. One of the primary reasons that the Israeli constitution remains unwritten is the fear by whatever party holds power that creating a written constitution, combined with the common-law elements, would severely limit the powers of the Knesset (which, following the doctrine of parliamentary sovereignty, holds near-unlimited power).

Roman Dutch common law 
Roman Dutch common law is a bijuridical or mixed system of law similar to the common law system in Scotland and Louisiana. Roman Dutch common law jurisdictions include South Africa, Botswana, Lesotho, Namibia, Swaziland, Sri Lanka and Zimbabwe. Many of these jurisdictions recognise customary law, and in some, such as South Africa the Constitution requires that the common law be developed in accordance with the Bill of Rights. Roman Dutch common law is a development of Roman Dutch law by courts in the Roman Dutch common law jurisdictions. During the Napoleonic wars the Kingdom of the Netherlands adopted the French code civil in 1809, however the Dutch colonies in the Cape of Good Hope and Sri Lanka, at the time called Ceylon, were seized by the British to prevent them being used as bases by the French Navy. The system was developed by the courts and spread with the expansion of British colonies in Southern Africa. Roman Dutch common law relies on legal principles set out in Roman law sources such as Justinian's Institutes and Digest, and also on the writing of Dutch jurists of the 17th century such as Grotius and Voet. In practice, the majority of decisions rely on recent precedent.

Ghana 
Ghana follows the English common-law tradition which was inherited from the British during her colonisation. Consequently, the laws of Ghana are, for the most part, a modified version of imported law that is continuously adapting to changing socio-economic and political realities of the country. The Bond of 1844 marked the period when the people of Ghana (then Gold Coast) ceded their independence to the British and gave the British judicial authority. Later, the Supreme Court Ordinance of 1876 formally introduced British law, be it the common law or statutory law, in the Gold Coast. Section 14 of the Ordinance formalised the application of the common-law tradition in the country.

Ghana, after independence, did not do away with the common law system inherited from the British, and today it has been enshrined in the 1992 Constitution of the country. Chapter four of Ghana's Constitution, entitled "The Laws of Ghana", has in Article 11(1) the list of laws applicable in the state. This comprises (a) the Constitution; (b) enactments made by or under the authority of the Parliament established by the Constitution; (c) any Orders, Rules and Regulations made by any person or authority under a power conferred by the Constitution; (d) the existing law; and (e) the common law. Thus, the modern-day Constitution of Ghana, like those before it, embraced the English common law by entrenching it in its provisions. The doctrine of judicial precedence which is based on the principle of stare decisis as applied in England and other pure common law countries also applies in Ghana.

Scholarly works 

Edward Coke, a 17th-century Lord Chief Justice of the English Court of Common Pleas and a Member of Parliament (MP), wrote several legal texts that collected and integrated centuries of case law. Lawyers in both England and America learned the law from his Institutes and Reports until the end of the 18th century. His works are still cited by common law courts around the world.

The next definitive historical treatise on the common law is Commentaries on the Laws of England, written by Sir William Blackstone and first published in 1765–1769. Since 1979, a facsimile edition of that first edition has been available in four paper-bound volumes. Today it has been superseded in the English part of the United Kingdom by Halsbury's Laws of England that covers both common and statutory English law.

While he was still on the Massachusetts Supreme Judicial Court, and before being named to the U.S. Supreme Court, Justice Oliver Wendell Holmes Jr. published a short volume called The Common Law, which remains a classic in the field. Unlike Blackstone and the Restatements, Holmes' book only briefly discusses what the law is; rather, Holmes describes the common law process. Law professor John Chipman Gray's The Nature and Sources of the Law, an examination and survey of the common law, is also still commonly read in U.S. law schools.

In the United States, Restatements of various subject matter areas (Contracts, Torts, Judgments, and so on.), edited by the American Law Institute, collect the common law for the area. The ALI Restatements are often cited by American courts and lawyers for propositions of uncodified common law, and are considered highly persuasive authority, just below binding precedential decisions. The Corpus Juris Secundum is an encyclopedia whose main content is a compendium of the common law and its variations throughout the various state jurisdictions.

Scots common law covers matters including murder and theft, and has sources in custom, in legal writings and previous court decisions. The legal writings used are called Institutional Texts and come mostly from the 17th, 18th and 19th centuries. Examples include Craig, Jus Feudale (1655) and Stair, The Institutions of the Law of Scotland (1681).

See also 
 Outline of law

Common law national legal systems today 
 List of common law national legal systems

Common vs. civil laws 
 Civil law
 Common law offences

Development of English legal system and case law 
 Books of authority
 Lists of case law

Early common law systems 
 Anglo-Saxon law
 Brehon law, or Irish law
 Doom book, or Code of Alfred the Great
 Time immemorial

Stages of common law trials 
 Arraignment
 Grand jury
 Jury trial

Common law in specific areas

Common law as applied to matrimony 
 Alimony
 Common-law marriage

Employment
 Faithless servant

Slavery 
 Slavery at common law

References

Further reading 
 Chapters 1–6.
 Crane, Elaine Forman (2011), Witches, Wife Beaters, and Whores: Common Law and Common Folk in Early America. Ithaca, NY: Cornell University Press. 
 
 
 
 
 
 
 Milsom, S.F.C., A Natural History of the Common Law. Columbia University Press (2003) 
 Milsom, S.F.C., Historical Foundations of the Common Law (2nd ed.). Lexis Law Publishing (Va), (1981)

External links 

 The History of the Common Law of England, and An analysis of the civil part of the law, Matthew Hale
  The History of English Law before the Time of Edward I, Pollock and Maitland
 Select Writs. (F.W.Maitland)
  Common-law Pleading: its history and principles, R.Ross Perry, (Boston, 1897)
 ; also available at The Climate Change and Public Health Law Site
 The Principle of stare decisis American Law Register
 The Australian Institute of Comparative Legal Systems
 The International Institute for Law and Strategic Studies (IILSS) 
 New South Wales Legislation
 Historical Laws of Hong Kong Online – University of Hong Kong Libraries, Digital Initiatives
 Maxims of Common Law from Bouvier's 1856 Law Dictionary

 
Legal history
Legal systems